Tuman Tumyan (1879–1906) was an active participant of the Armenian national liberation movement.

Tuman Tumyan was born in 1879 in Shusha, Russian Empire and had his local education there; one of his classmates was famed revolutionary Garegin Nzhdeh. Tumanian became known throughout Karabakh when he began publishing the Kokon newspaper in Shushi. He was instrumental in the engagement of gathering volunteer troops in Western Armenia. Tumanian died in action in 1906. Poet Avetik Isahakian dedicated his famous song "Vorskan Akhper" to Tumian.

References

1879 births
1906 deaths
Politicians from Shusha
Armenian fedayi
Armenian nationalists
Armenian revolutionaries
Guerrillas killed in action